Wout-Jan van der Schans (born 12 May 1961) is a Dutch equestrian. He competed in two events at the 1988 Summer Olympics.

References

External links
 

1961 births
Living people
Dutch male equestrians
Olympic equestrians of the Netherlands
Equestrians at the 1988 Summer Olympics
People from Ede, Netherlands
Sportspeople from Gelderland